Social mobility is the movement of individuals, families, households or other categories of people within or between social strata in a society.  It is a change in social status relative to one's current social location within a given society. This movement occurs between layers or tiers in an open system of social stratification. Open stratification systems are those in which at least some value is given to achieved status characteristics in a society. The movement can be in a downward or upward direction. Markers for social mobility such as education and class,  are used to predict, discuss and learn more about an individual or a group's mobility in society.

Typology
Mobility is most often quantitatively measured in terms of change in economic mobility such as changes in income or wealth.  Occupation is another measure used in researching mobility which usually involves both quantitative and qualitative analysis of data, but other studies may concentrate on social class. Mobility may be intragenerational, within the same generation or intergenerational, between different generations. Intragenerational mobility is less frequent, representing "rags to riches" cases in terms of upward mobility.  Intergenerational upward mobility is more common where children or grandchildren are in economic circumstances better than those of their parents or grandparents. In the US, this type of mobility is described as one of the fundamental features of the "American Dream" even though there is less such mobility than almost all other OECD countries.

Mobility can also be defined in terms of relative or absolute mobility. Absolute mobility looks at a society's progress in the areas of education, health, housing, job opportunities and other factors and compares it across generations. As technological advancements and globalization increase so do income levels and the conditions in which people live. In absolute terms, people around the world, on average, are living better today than yesterday. Relative mobility looks at the mobility of a person in comparison to the mobility of others in the same cohort or their parent. In more advanced economies and OECD countries there is more space for relative mobility than for absolute mobility. This is because developed countries or advanced economies have a baseline for the conditions in which people live that is better than it was years ago. However, developing economies have a wider margin for absolute mobility since they are still combating issues such as sanitation. Moreover, there can be downward or upward mobility.

There is also an idea of stickiness concerning mobility. This is when an individual is no longer experiencing relative mobility and it occurs mostly at the ends. At the bottom end of the socioeconomic ladder, parents cannot provide their children with the necessary resources or opportunity to enhance their lives. As a result, they remain on the same ladder rung as their parents. On the opposite side of the ladder, the high socioeconomic status parents have the necessary resources and opportunities to ensure their children also remain in same ladder rung as them.

Social status and social class

Social mobility is highly dependent on the overall structure of social statuses and occupations in a given society. The extent of differing social positions and the manner in which they fit together or overlap provides the overall social structure of such positions.  Add to this the differing dimensions of status, such as Max Weber's delineation of economic stature, prestige, and power and we see the potential for complexity in a given social stratification system. Such dimensions within a given society can be seen as independent variables that can explain differences in social mobility at different times and places in different stratification systems. In addition, the same variables that contribute as intervening variables to the valuation of income or wealth and that also affect social status, social class, and social inequality do affect social mobility.  These include sex or gender, race or ethnicity, and age.

Education provides one of the most promising chances of upward social mobility and attaining a higher social status, regardless of current social standing. However, the stratification of social classes and high wealth inequality directly affects the educational opportunities and outcomes. In other words, social class and a family's socioeconomic status directly affect a child's chances for obtaining a quality education and succeeding in life. By age five, there are significant developmental differences between low, middle, and upper class children's cognitive and noncognitive skills. 
Among older children, evidence suggests that the gap between high- and low-income primary- and secondary-school students has increased by almost 40 percent over the past thirty years. These differences persist and widen into young adulthood and beyond. Just as the gap in K–12 test scores between high- and low-income students is growing, the difference in college graduation rates between the rich and the poor is also growing. Although the college graduation rate among the poorest households increased by about 4 percentage points between those born in the early 1960s and those born in the early 1980s, over this same period, the graduation rate increased by almost 20 percentage points for the wealthiest households.

Average family income, and social status, have both seen a decrease for the bottom third of all children between 1975 and 2011. The 5th percentile of children and their families have seen up to a 60% decrease in average family income. The wealth gap between the rich and the poor, the upper and lower class, continues to increase as more middle-class people get poorer and the lower-class get even poorer. As the socioeconomic inequality continues to increase in the United States, being on either end of the spectrum makes a child more likely to remain there and never become socially mobile.
A child born to parents with income in the lowest quintile is more than ten times more likely to end up in the lowest quintile than the highest as an adult (43 percent versus 4 percent). And, a child born to parents in the highest quintile is five times more likely to end up in the highest quintile than the lowest (40 percent versus 8 percent).

This may be partly due to lower- and working-class parents (where neither is educated above high school diploma level) spending less time on average with their children in their earliest years of life and not being as involved in their children's education and time out of school. This parenting style, known as "accomplishment of natural growth" differs from the style of middle-class and upper-class parents (with at least one parent having higher education), known as "cultural cultivation". More affluent social classes are able to spend more time with their children at early ages, and children receive more exposure to interactions and activities that lead to cognitive and non-cognitive development: things like verbal communication, parent-child engagement and being read to daily. These children's parents are much more involved in their academics and their free time; placing them in extracurricular activities which develop not only additional non-cognitive skills but also academic values, habits, and abilities to better communicate and interact with authority figures. Lower class children often attend lower quality schools, receive less attention from teachers and ask for help much less than their higher class peers.

The chances for social mobility are primarily determined by the family a child is born into. Today, the gaps seen in both access to education and educational success (graduating from a higher institution) is even larger. Today, while college applicants from every socioeconomic class are equally qualified, 75% of all entering freshmen classes at top-tier American institutions belong to the uppermost socioeconomic quartile. A family's class determines the amount of investment and involvement parents have in their children's educational abilities and success from their earliest years of life, leaving low-income students with less chance for academic success and social mobility due to the effects that the (common) parenting style of the lower and working-class have on their outlook on and success in education.

Class cultures and social networks

These differing dimensions of social mobility can be classified in terms of differing types of capital that contribute to changes in mobility.  Cultural capital, a term first coined by French sociologist Pierre Bourdieu distinguishes between the economic and cultural aspects of class. Bourdieu described three types of capital that place a person in a certain social category: economic capital; social capital; and cultural capital.  Economic capital includes economic resources such as cash, credit, and other material assets. Social capital includes resources one achieves based on group membership, networks of influence, relationships and support from other people. Cultural capital is any advantage a person has that gives them a higher status in society, such as education, skills, or any other form of knowledge. Usually, people with all three types of capital have a high status in society. Bourdieu found that the culture of the upper social class is oriented more toward formal reasoning and abstract thought. The lower social class is geared more towards matters of facts and the necessities of life. He also found that the environment in which a person develops has a large effect on the cultural resources that a person will have.

The cultural resources a person has obtained can heavily influence a child's educational success. It has been shown that students raised under the concerted cultivation approach have "an emerging sense of entitlement" which leads to asking teachers more questions and being a more active student, causing teachers to favor students raised in this manner. This childrearing approach which creates positive interactions in the classroom environment is in contrast with the natural growth approach to childrearing. In this approach, which is more common amongst working-class families, parents do not focus on developing the special talents of their individual children, and they speak to their children in directives. Due to this, it is rarer for a child raised in this manner to question or challenge adults and conflict arises between childrearing practices at home and school. Children raised in this manner are less inclined to participate in the classroom setting and are less likely to go out of their way to positively interact with teachers and form relationships.

In the United States, links between minority underperformance in schools have been made with a lacking in the cultural resources of cultural capital, social capital and economic capital, yet inconsistencies persist even when these variables are accounted for. "Once admitted to institutions of higher education, African Americans and Latinos continued to underperform relative to their white and Asian counterparts, earning lower grades, progressing at a slower rate and dropping out at higher rates. More disturbing was the fact that these differentials persisted even after controlling for obvious factors such as SAT scores and family socioeconomic status".

The theory of capital deficiency is among the most recognized explanations for minority underperformance academically—that for whatever reason they simply lack the resources to find academic success. One of the largest factors for this, aside from the social, economic, and cultural capital mentioned earlier, is human capital. This form of capital, identified by social scientists only in recent years, has to do with the education and life preparation of children. "Human capital refers to the skills, abilities and knowledge possessed by specific individuals". This allows college-educated parents who have large amounts of human capital to invest in their children in certain ways to maximize future success—from reading to them at night to possessing a better understanding of the school system which causes them to be less deferential to teachers and school authorities. Research also shows that well-educated black parents are less able to transmit human capital to their children when compared to their white counterparts, due to a legacy of racism and discrimination.

Markers

Health
The term "social gradient" in health refers to the idea that the inequalities in health are connected to the social status a person has. Two ideas concerning the relationship between health and social mobility are the social causation hypothesis and the health selection hypothesis. These hypotheses explore whether health dictates social mobility or whether social mobility dictates quality of health. The social causation hypothesis states that social factors (individual behavior and the environmental circumstances) determine an individual's health. Conversely, the health selection hypothesis states that health determines what social stratum an individual will be in.

There has been a lot of research investigating the relationship between socioeconomic status and health and which has the greater influence on the other. A recent study has found that the social causation hypothesis is more empirically supported than the health selection hypothesis. Empirical analysis shows no support for the health selection hypothesis.  Another study found support for either hypotheses depends on which lens the relationship between SES and health is being looked through. The health selection hypothesis is supported when people looking at SES and health through labor market lens. One possible reason for this is health dictates an individual's productivity and to a certain extent if the individual is employed. While, the social causation hypothesis is supported when looking at health and socioeconomic status relationship through an education and income lenses.

Education
The systems of stratification that govern societies hinder or allow social mobility. Education can be a tool used by individuals to move from one stratum to another in stratified societies. Higher education policies have worked to establish and reinforce stratification.  Greater gaps in education quality and investment in students among elite and standard universities account for the lower upward social mobility of the middle class and/or low class. Conversely, the upper class is known to be self-reproducing since they have the necessary resources and money to afford, and get into, an elite university. This class is self-reproducing because these same students can then give the same opportunities to their children. Another example of this is high and middle socioeconomic status parents are able to send their children to an early education program, enhancing their chances at academic success in the later years.

Housing

Mixed housing is the idea that people of different socioeconomic statuses can live in one area. There is not a lot of research on the effects of mixed housing. However, the general consensus is that mixed housing will allow individuals of low socioeconomic status to acquire the necessary resources and social connections to move up the social ladder. Other possible effects mixed housing can bring are positive behavioral changes and improved sanitation and safer living conditions for the low socioeconomic status residents. This is because higher socioeconomic status individuals are more likely to demand higher quality residencies, schools, and infrastructure. This type of housing is funded by profit, nonprofit and public organizations.

The existing research on mixed housing, however, shows that mixed housing does not promote or facilitate upward social mobility. Instead of developing complex relationships among each other, mixed housing residents of different socioeconomic statuses tend to engage in casual conversations and keep to themselves. If noticed and unaddressed for a long period of time, this can lead to the gentrification of a community.
Outside of mixed housing, individuals with a low socioeconomic status consider relationships to be more salient than the type of neighborhood they live to their prospects of moving up the social ladder. This is because their income is often not enough to cover their monthly expenses including rent. The strong relationships they have with others offers the support system they need in order for them to meet their monthly expenses. At times, low income families might decide to double up in a single residency to lessen the financial burden on each family. However, this type of support system, that low socioeconomic status individuals have, is still not enough to promote upward relative mobility.

Income

Economic and social mobility are two separate entities. Economic mobility is used primarily by economists to evaluate income mobility.  Conversely, social mobility is used by sociologists to evaluate primarily class mobility. How strongly economic and social mobility are related depends on the strength of the intergenerational relationship between class and income of parents and kids, and "the covariance between parents' and children's class position".

Additionally, economic and social mobility can also be thought of as following the Great Gatsby curve. This curve demonstrates that high levels of economic inequality fosters low rates of relative social mobility. The culprit behind this model is the Economic Despair idea, which states that as the gap between the bottom and middle of income distribution increases those who are at the bottom are less likely to invest in their human capital as they lose faith in their ability to experience upward mobility. An example of this is seen in education, particularly in high school drop-outs. Low income status students who no longer see value in investing in their education, after continuously performing poorly academically, drop out to join the work force.

Race
Race as an influencer on social mobility stems from colonial times. There has been discussion as to whether race can still hinder an individual's chances at upward mobility or whether class has a greater influence. A study performed on the Brazilian population found that racial inequality was only present for those who did not belong to the high-class status. Meaning race affects an individual's chances at upward mobility if they do not begin at the upper-class population. Another theory concerning race and mobility is, as time progresses, racial inequality will be replaced by class inequality. However, other research has found that minorities, particularly African Americans, are still being policed and observed more at their jobs than their white counterparts. The constant policing has often led to the frequent firing of African Americans. In this case, African Americans experience racial inequality that stunts their upward social mobility.

Gender
Women, in comparison to men, experience less social mobility. One possible reason for this is the poor quality or lack of education that females receive. In countries like India it is common for  educated women not use their education to move up the social ladder due to cultural and traditional customs. They are expected to become homemakers and leave the bread winning to the men. Additionally, women around the world are denied an education as their families may find it more economically beneficial to invest in the education and wellbeing of their males instead of their females. In the parent's eyes the son will be the one who provides for them in their old age while the daughter will move away with her husband. The son will bring an income while the daughter might require a dowry to get married. Moreover, when women do enter the workforce, they are highly unlikely to earn the same pay as their male counterparts. Furthermore, women can even differ in pay among each other due to race. To combat these gender disparities, the UN has made it one of their goals on the Millennium Development Goals reduce gender inequality. This goal is accused of being too broad and having no action plan.

Patterns of mobility

While it is generally accepted that some level of mobility in society is desirable, there is no consensus agreement upon "how much" social mobility is good for or bad for a society. There is no international benchmark of social mobility, though one can compare measures of mobility across regions or countries or within a given area over time. While cross-cultural studies comparing differing types of economies are possible, comparing economies of similar type usually yields more comparable data. Such comparisons typically look at intergenerational mobility, examining the extent to which children born into different families have different life chances and outcomes.

In a study for which the results were first published in 2009, Wilkinson and Pickett conduct an exhaustive analysis of social mobility in developed countries. In addition to other correlations with negative social outcomes for societies having high inequality, they found a relationship between high social inequality and low social mobility. Of the eight countries studied—Canada, Denmark, Finland, Sweden, Norway, Germany, the UK and the US, the US had both the highest economic inequality and lowest economic mobility.  In this and other studies, in fact, the USA has very low mobility at the lowest rungs of the socioeconomic ladder, with mobility increasing slightly as one goes up the ladder.  At the top rung of the ladder, however, mobility again decreases.

One study comparing social mobility between developed countries found that the four countries with the lowest "intergenerational income elasticity", i.e. the highest social mobility, were Denmark, Norway, Finland and Canada with less than 20% of advantages of having a high income parent passed on to their children.

Studies have also found "a clear negative relationship" between income inequality and intergenerational mobility. Countries with low levels of inequality such as Denmark, Norway and Finland had some of the greatest mobility, while the two countries with the high level of inequality—Chile and Brazil—had some of the lowest mobility.

In Britain, much debate on social mobility has been generated by comparisons of the 1958 National Child Development Study (NCDS) and the 1970 Birth Cohort Study BCS70, which compare intergenerational mobility in earnings between the 1958 and the 1970 UK cohorts, and claim that intergenerational mobility decreased substantially in this 12-year period. These findings have been controversial, partly due to conflicting findings on social class mobility using the same datasets, and partly due to questions regarding the analytical sample and the treatment of missing data. UK Prime Minister Gordon Brown has famously said that trends in social mobility "are not as we would have liked".

Along with the aforementioned "Do Poor Children Become Poor Adults?" study, The Economist also stated that "evidence from social scientists suggests that American society is much 'stickier' than most Americans assume. Some researchers claim that social mobility is actually declining." A German study corroborates these results. In spite of this low mobility Americans have had the highest belief in meritocracy among middle- and high-income countries. A study of social mobility among the French corporate class has found that class continues to influence who reaches the top in France, with those from the upper-middle classes tending to dominate, despite a longstanding emphasis on meritocracy.

Thomas Piketty (2014) finds that wealth-income ratios, today, seem to be returning to very high levels in low economic growth countries, similar to what he calls the "classic patrimonial" wealth-based societies of the 19th century wherein a minority lives off its wealth while the rest of the population works for subsistence living.

Social mobility can also be influenced by differences that exist within education. The contribution of education to social mobility often gets neglected in social mobility research although it really has the potential to transform the relationship between origins and destinations. Recognizing the disparities between strictly location and its educational opportunities highlights how patterns of educational mobility are influencing the capacity for individuals to experience social mobility. There is some debate regarding how important educational attainment is for social mobility. A substantial literature argues that there is a direct effect of social origins (DESO) which cannot be explained by educational attainment. However, other evidence suggests that, using a sufficiently fine-grained measure of educational attainment, taking on board such factors as university status and field of study, education fully mediates the link between social origins and access to top class jobs.

The patterns of educational mobility that exist between inner-city schools versus schools in the suburbs is transparent. Graduation rates supply a rich context to these patterns. In the 2013–14 school year, Detroit Public Schools observed a graduation rate of 71% whereas Grosse Pointe High School (Detroit suburb) observed an average graduation rate of 94%. A similar phenomena was observed in Los Angeles, California as well as in New York City. Los Angeles Senior High School (inner city) observed a graduation rate of 58% and San Marino High School (suburb) observed a graduation rate of 96%. New York City Geographic District Number Two (inner city) observed a graduation rate of 69% and Westchester School District (suburb) observed a graduation rate of 85%. These patterns were observed across the country when assessing the differences between inner city graduation rates and suburban graduation rates.

Influence of intelligence and education

Social status attainment and therefore social mobility in adulthood are of interest to psychologists, sociologists, political scientists, economists, epidemiologists and many more. The reason behind the interest is because it indicates access to material goods, educational opportunities, healthy environments, and economic growth.

Researchers did a study that encompassed a wide range of data of individuals in lifetime (in childhood and during mid-adulthood). Most of the Scottish children which were born in 1921 participated in the Scottish Mental Survey 1932, which was conducted under the auspices of the Scottish Council for Research in Education (SCRE) and obtained the data of psychometric intelligence of Scottish pupils. The number of children who took the mental ability test (based on the Moray House tests) was 87,498. They were between age 10 and 11. The tests covered general, spatial and numerical reasoning.

At midlife period, a subset of the subjects participated in one of the studies, which were large health studies of adults and were carried out in Scotland in the 1960s and 1970s. The particular study they took part in was the collaborative study of 6022 men and 1006 women, conducted between 1970 and 1973 in Scotland. Participants completed a questionnaire (participant's address, father's occupation, the participant's own first regular occupation, the age of finishing full-time education, number of siblings, and if the participant was a regular car driver) and attended a physical examination (measurement of height). Social class was coded according to the Registrar General's Classification for the participant's occupation at the time of screening, his first occupation and his father's occupation. Researchers separated into six social classes were used.

A correlation and structural equation model analysis was conducted. In the structural equation models, social status in the 1970s was the main outcome variable. The main contributors to education (and first social class) were father's social class and IQ at age 11, which was also found in a Scandinavian study. This effect was direct and also mediated via education and the participant's first job.

Participants at midlife did not necessarily end up in the same social class as their fathers. There was social mobility in the sample: 45% of men were upwardly mobile, 14% were downward mobile and 41% were socially stable. IQ at age 11 had a graded relationship with participant's social class. The same effect was seen for father's occupation. Men at midlife social class I and II (the highest, more professional) also had the highest IQ at age 11. Height at midlife, years of education and childhood IQ were significantly positively related to upward social mobility, while number of siblings had no significant effect. For each standard deviation increase in IQ score at the age 11, the chances of upward social mobility increases by 69% (with a 95% confidence). After controlling the effect of independent variables, only IQ at age 11 was significantly inversely related to downward movement in social mobility. More years of education increase the chance that a father's son will surpass his social class, whereas low IQ makes a father's son prone to falling behind his father's social class.

Higher IQ at age 11 was also significantly related to higher social class at midlife, higher likelihood car driving at midlife, higher first social class, higher father's social class, fewer siblings, higher age of education, being taller and living in a less deprived neighbourhood at midlife. IQ was significantly more strongly related to the social class in midlife than the social class of the first job.

Finally, height, education and IQ at age 11 were predictors of upward social mobility and only IQ at age 11 and height were significant predictors of downward social mobility. Number of siblings was not significant in either of the models.

Another research looked into the pivotal role of education in association between ability and social class attainment through three generations (fathers, participants and offspring) using the SMS1932 (Lothian Birth Cohort 1921) educational data, childhood ability and late life intellectual function data. It was proposed that social class of origin acts as a ballast restraining otherwise meritocratic social class movement, and that education is the primary means through which social class movement is both restrained and facilitated—therefore acting in a pivotal role.

It was found that social class of origin predicts educational attainment in both the participant's and offspring generations. Father's social class and participant's social class held the same importance in predicting offspring educational attainment—effect across two generations. Educational attainment mediated the association of social class attainments across generations (father's and participants social class, participant's and offspring's social class). There was no direct link between social classes across generations, but in each generation educational attainment was a predictor of social class, which is consistent with other studies. Also, participant's childhood ability moderately predicted their educational and social class attainment (.31 and .38). Participant's educational attainment was strongly linked with the odds of moving downward or upward on the social class ladder. For each SD increase in education, the odds of moving upward on the social class spectrum were 2.58 times greater (the downward ones were .26 times greater). Offspring's educational attainment was also strongly linked with the odds of moving upward or downward on the social class ladder. For each SD increase in education, the odds of moving upward were 3.54 times greater (the downward ones were .40 times greater). In conclusion, education is very important, because it is the fundamental mechanism functioning both to hold individuals in their social class of origin and to make it possible for their movement upward or downward on the social class ladder.

In the Cohort 1936 it was found that regarding whole generations (not individuals) the social mobility between father's and participant's generation is: 50.7% of the participant generation have moved upward in relation to their fathers, 22.1% had moved downwards, and 27.2% had remained stable in their social class. There was a lack of social mobility in the offspring generation as a whole. However, there was definitely individual offspring movement on the social class ladder: 31.4% had higher social class attainment than their participant parents (grandparents), 33.7% moved downward, and 33.9% stayed stable. Participant's childhood mental ability was linked to social class in all three generations. A very important pattern has also been confirmed: average years of education increased with social class and IQ.

There were some great contributors to social class attainment and social class mobility in the twentieth century: Both social class attainment and social mobility are influenced by pre-existing levels of mental ability, which was in consistence with other studies. So, the role of individual level mental ability in pursuit of educational attainment—professional positions require specific educational credentials. Furthermore, educational attainment contributes to social class attainment through the contribution of mental ability to educational attainment. Even further, mental ability can contribute to social class attainment independent of actual educational attainment, as in when the educational attainment is prevented, individuals with higher mental ability manage to make use of the mental ability to work their way up on the social ladder. This study made clear that intergenerational transmission of educational attainment is one of the key ways in which social class was maintained within family, and there was also evidence that education attainment was increasing over time. Finally, the results suggest that social mobility (moving upward and downward) has increased in recent years in Britain. Which according to one researcher is important because an overall mobility of about 22% is needed to keep the distribution of intelligence relatively constant from one generation to the other within each occupational category.

Researchers looked into the effects elitist and non-elitist education systems have on social mobility. Education policies are often critiqued based on their impact on a single generation, but it is important to look at education policies and the effects they have on social mobility. In the research, elitist schools are defined as schools that focus on providing its best students with the tools to succeed, whereas an egalitarian school is one that predicates itself on giving equal opportunity to all its students to achieve academic success.

When private education supplements were not considered, it was found that the greatest amount of social mobility was derived from a system with the least elitist public education system. It was also discovered that the system with the most elitist policies produced the greatest amount of utilitarian welfare. Logically, social mobility decreases with more elitist education systems and utilitarian welfare decreases with less elitist public education policies.

When private education supplements are introduced, it becomes clear that some elitist policies promote some social mobility and that an egalitarian system is the most successful at creating the maximum amount of welfare. These discoveries were justified from the reasoning that elitist education systems discourage skilled workers from supplementing their children's educations with private expenditures.

The authors of the report showed that they can challenge conventional beliefs that elitist and regressive educational policy is the ideal system. This is explained as the researchers found that education has multiple benefits. It brings more productivity and has a value, which was a new thought for education. This shows that the arguments for the regressive model should not be without qualifications. Furthermore, in the elitist system, the effect of earnings distribution on growth is negatively impacted due to the polarizing social class structure with individuals at the top with all the capital and individuals at the bottom with nothing.

Education is very important in determining the outcome of one's future. It is almost impossible to achieve upward mobility without education. Education is frequently seen as a strong driver of social mobility. The quality of one's education varies depending on the social class that they are in. The higher the family income the better opportunities one is given to get a good education. The inequality in education makes it harder for low-income families to achieve social mobility. Research has indicated that inequality is connected to the deficiency of social mobility. In a period of growing inequality and low social mobility, fixing the quality of and access to education has the possibility to increase equality of opportunity for all Americans.

"One significant consequence of growing income inequality is that, by historical standards, high-income households are spending much more on their children's education than low-income households." With the lack of total income, low-income families can't afford to spend money on their children's education. Research has shown that over the past few years, families with high income has increased their spending on their children's education. High income families were paying $3,500 per year and now it has increased up to nearly $9,000, which is seven times more than what low income families pay for their kids' education. The increase in money spent on education has caused an increase in college graduation rates for the families with high income. The increase in graduation rates is causing an even bigger gap between high income children and low-income children. Given the significance of a college degree in today's labor market, rising differences in college completion signify rising differences in outcomes in the future.

Family income is one of the most important factors in determining the mental ability (intelligence) of their children. With such bad education that urban schools are offering, parents of high income are moving out of these areas to give their children a better opportunity to succeed. As urban school systems worsen, high income families move to rich suburbs because that is where they feel better education is; if they do stay in the city, they put their children to private schools. Low income families do not have a choice but to settle for the bad education because they cannot afford to relocate to rich suburbs. The more money and time parents invest in their child plays a huge role in determining their success in school. Research has shown that higher mobility levels are perceived for locations where there are better schools.

See also 

 Great Gatsby Curve
 Global Social Mobility Index
 Horizontal mobility
 Levelling up policy of the Boris Johnson government
 Social and Cultural Mobility (book)
 Socio-economic mobility in the United States

References

Further reading

External links 

 The New York Times offers a graphic about social mobility, overall trends, income elasticity and country by country. European nations such as Denmark and France, are ahead of the US. 

Social classes
Social inequality
 
Social stratification